Ibolya Fekete, (born 23 January 1951 in Pásztó), is a Hungarian film director and screenwriter.

Biography 
After successfully completing her studies of Hungarian and Russian literature and linguistics at the Lajos Kossuth University in Debrecen (by now part of the University of Debrecen) in 1976, Ibolya Fekete first worked as a screenwriter, amongst others for György Szomjas, before she also started to work as a dramaturge for Hunnia Filmstudio, one of the four Hungarian film studios joined under the common brand of Mafilm in 1990, and – under the impression of the fall-down of the Iron Curtain and Berlin's Wall – debuting in the same year with her documentary „Berlin and Back“ as a filmdirector.

Since 2003 teaching at the Budapest Filmacademy, she currently also works as a guest professor at the Sapientia Hungarian University of Transylvania in Cluj-Napoca, Romania.

Filmography 
 1985 „Wall Driller“ (Falfúró), feature film by György Szomjas, 100 min - co-screenplay writer
 1986 „Mr. Universe“ (Mr. Universe), feature film by György Szomjas, 98 min - screenplay writer
 1989 „Fast and Loose“ (Könnyű vér), feature film by György Szomjas, 87 min - screenplay writer 
 1989–1990 „Berlin and Back“ (Berlinből Berlinbe), documentary, 53 min - director
 1991–1992 „Children of the Apocalypse I-II“ (Az apokalipszis gyermekei I-II), documentary, 120 min - director
 1996 „Bolshe Vita“ (Bolse vita), feature film, 97 min - director, screenplay writer 
 1997 „Four songs from Eastern Europe“ (Négy dal Kelet-Európából), documentary, 22 min - director 
 2001 „Chico“ (Chico), feature film (HU/DE/HR/CL), 102 min - director, screenplay writer 
 2001 „Documentaries“ (Dokumentátorok), documentary, 41 min - director
 2002 „Sándor Simó“ (Simó Sándor), documentary, 40 min - director
 2004 „Journeys with a Monk“ (Utazások egy szerzetessel), documentary, 65 min - director 
 2005 „The Master and Margarita“ (A Mester és Margarita), TV short film, 26 min - director
 2007 „The Csángós“ (Csángók), documentary, 91 min - director
 2015 „Mom and Other Loonies in the Family“ (Anyám és más futóbolondok a családból), feature film (HU/DE/BG), 113 min - director, screenplay writer

Awards 
 1996 „Bolshe Vita“
 1996 Best Debut Award at the Hungarian Filmweek Budapest 
 1996 Gene-Moskowitz-Prize of Foreign Film Critics at the Hungarian Filmweek Budapest
 1996 Main Prize and FIPRESCI-Award at the ″Kinotavr" Film Festival Sochi
 1996 Main Prize and Don-Quixote-Award at the Festival of Young East-European Cinema Cottbus
 1996 Satyajit-Ray-Award at the London Film Festival
 1996 Special Prize of the European Parliament at the Prix-Europa-Festival Berlin 
 1996 Main Prize at the Lubusian Filmsummer Łagów, Poland
 1997 Main Prize at the Angers European First Film Festival, France
 1997 László-B.-Nagy-Award of the Hungarian film critics
 1997 Béla-Balázs-Award of the Hungarian Ministry of Culture
 2001 „Chico“
 2001 Ecumenical Award and Directory Award at the Karlovy Vary International Film Festival
 2002 Best Feature Film und Prize of the Turkish film critics at the Rendezvous Istanbul International Film Festival
 2002 Main Prize at the Lubusian Filmsummer Łagów, Poland
 2002 Main Prize at the Hungarian Film Week Budapest
 2002 Prize of the Freedom Film Festival Berlin
 2003 Directory Award of the Hungarian film critics
 2005 „Journeys with a Monk“
 2005 Prize of the Hungarian Ministry for Youth, Family and Social Affairs
 2007 Special Jury Award during WorldFest-Houston International Film Festival, USA
 2015 „Mom and Other Loonies in the Family“
 2015 Best Screenplay Award of the Hungarian film critics

References

External links 
 Ibolya Fekete at IMDb
 Ibolya Fekete at PORT.hu

1951 births
Living people
Hungarian film directors
Hungarian women film directors
Women film directors
Women screenwriters
Hungarian screenwriters
20th-century screenwriters